Electric Phin Band is the debut live album of Khun Narin, released on August 26, 2014 by Innovative Leisure Records.

Critical reception 

Reception of Electric Phin Band has been positive. In his review for Allmusic, Fred Thomas described the group's playing as "warped, drunkenly playful, and mired in the influence of Western pop and celebratory psychedelia." Dustin Krcatovich of The Quietus was similarly enthusiastic, saying "the music shares rock and roll's mother-heartbeat propulsion but largely eschews its structures, having much more to do with traditional Thai folk forms. The resulting music is raucous, deft, loud, and awesome." Music journalist Robert Christgau gave the album a B+ on his rating scale, calling the music "lively yet quiet."

Track listing

Personnel
Adapted from the Electric Phin Band liner notes.

Khun Narin
 Sitthichai Charoenkhwan – phin
 Witthawat Chimphali – bass drum
 Buntham Makam – bass drum
 Wirot Manachip – ching
 Wanlop Saengarun – drums, cymbal
 Chaiphichit Taraphan – bass guitar
 Wirot Yakham – musical direction, cymbal

Production and additional personnel
 Nathan Cabrera – cover art
 Josh Marcy – production, recording, photography
 Trevor Tarczynski – design

Chart positions

Release history

References

External links 
 
 Electric Phin Band at Bandcamp

2014 debut albums
Khun Narin albums
Instrumental albums